Spot or SPOT may refer to:

Places
 Spot, North Carolina, a community in the United States
 The Spot, New South Wales, a locality in Sydney, Australia
 South Pole Traverse, sometimes called the South Pole Overland Traverse

People
 Spot Collins (1922-1996), American football player and coach
 Jack Comer (1912–1996), Polish-born English gangster nicknamed "Spot"
 Jerry Chamberlain (known as "Spot"), the guitarist for the rock group the Swirling Eddies
 Scott Draves (known as "Spot"), digital artist and VJ
 Spot (producer), Glenn Michael Lockett (1951–2023), house producer and engineer for the label SST Records
 Spot (rapper) (born 1987), American rapper
 Moondog Spot, a ring name for professional wrestler Larry Booker

Advertising
 Radio spot, an over-the-air advertisement
 TV spot, a televised advertisement
 Underwriting spot, an announcement made on public broadcasting outlets, especially in the United States, in exchange for funding

Animals

 Spot, a dog that remained faithful after his master's death, described in the List of individual dogs
 Spot Fetcher, a dog owned by U.S. President George W. Bush

Arts and entertainment

Fictional characters
 Spot, a character in the 2015 Disney/Pixar animated film The Good Dinosaur
 Spot (chicken), in 101 Dalmatians: The Series
 Spot (comics), a Spider-Man villain
 Spot (franchise), the titular puppy in a series of children's books and animated television shows created by Eric Hill
 Spot (Star Trek), a pet cat in Star Trek: The Next Generation
 Spot, a pet dog in the Dick and Jane textbook series
 Spot, a cat in the cartoon series Hong Kong Phooey
 Spot, a pet dog from the William Joyce series Rolie Polie Olie
 Spot, a pet amoeba in the animated series SpongeBob SquarePants season 11
 Spot, a deity in a sketch by Canadian comedy troupe The Kids In The Hall
 Spot, a pet dragon in the TV series The Munsters
 Spot, Dairine's sentient computer in the Young Wizards series
Spot, a dog in the Isle of Dogs movie

Music
 Spot (album), by the synthpop band And One
 Spot (music festival), a music festival held in Denmark
 "Sex Pistols On Tour Secretly" or SPOTS, a name the Sex Pistols toured under in the United Kingdom

Biology and healthcare
 Spot (fish), a fish (Leiostomus xanthurus)
 SpoT, a bacterial protein that hydrolizes (p)ppGpp

Brands and enterprises
 SPoT Coffee, a coffee chain
 Spotify (NYSE: SPOT), Swedish media company
 Spot, a mascot for 7 Up soft drinks

Technology
 SPOT (satellite) (Satellite Pour l'Observation de la Terre), an Earth-observing satellite family
 Single Point of Truth or SPOT, a principle aimed at reducing duplication in software engineering
 Smart Personal Objects Technology or SPOT, a Microsoft initiative
 SPOT Satellite Messenger, a GPS tracking device
 Spot, a four-legged canine-inspired robot made by  Boston Dynamics
 Spot, a 3D test model of a cow

Other meanings
 USS Spot, an American World War II submarine later sold to Chile and renamed
 Spot (professional wrestling), a pre-planned wrestling move or series of moves
 SPOT (TSA program), or "Screening of Passengers by Observation Techniques", an airport security technique
 Spotlight, called spot for short
 Spot, American slang for a music venue or club
 Spot, old Australian and New Zealand slang for one hundred dollars
 Spots (cannabis), a method of smoking cannabis, often called hotknifing in the United States

See also
 
 Spotz (disambiguation)

Lists of people by nickname